Matilda Koen-Sarano (in ; born 1939 in Milan, Italy), is an Israeli writer. Born to Turkish Jewish parents, she is one of the most widely known writers in the Ladino language.

Biography
Koen-Sarano was born in Milan in 1939 to a Sephardic family from Turkey. Her grandfather, Moshe, was born in Bergama in 1874. Her parents, Alfredo Sarano and Diana Hadjes, were both born in Aydın. Her father lived in Rhodes until 1925, while her mother in İzmir until 1938, marrying in Milan in 1938. During World War II, the family hid in the Italian mountains from the Nazi persecutions. Her father became the Secretary of the Jewish Community of Milan from 1945 until 1969. She married Aaron Koen and made aliya in 1960.

Career

Matilda studied in the Jewish Community School of Milan, and also studied languages at the Bocconi University in Milan and also Italian literature and Judaeo-Spanish literature and Judaeo-Spanish folklore at the Hebrew University of Jerusalem.

She made aliyah in 1960. In the summer of 1979, she participated in the seminar for Ladino language radio producers held at Kol Israel. This sparked in her the desire to write in this language and of putting the spotlight on everything she lived by the end of her childhood. In order to achieve this, she started interviewing several people from the Sephardic world to record and keep hundreds of folk tales and traditional stories. Besides, this activity she made her return to the university as a scholar. Then she published her first book of Sephardic folk tales, named Kuentos del Folklor de la Famiya Djudeo-Espanyola (Folk Tales of the Judaeo-Spanish Family) in 1986, in Jerusalem.

In April 2009 she published her most recent book, "Kon bayles i kantes, Sefaradis de dor en dor" (With Dances and Songs, Sephardim from Generation to Generation).

Koen-Sarano has taught Ladino at the Ben-Gurion University of the Negev since 1996 and a course for Ladino Teachers, organized by The National Authority for Ladino and its Culture, in Jerusalem since 1998. Also, she writes the Judeo-Spanish News at Kol Israel.

Personal life
Koren-Sarano is a mother of three and grandmother of eight. Her daughter, Liora Kelman, co-authored with her the cookbook Gizar kon Gozo.

Published works

Story books
Kuentos del folklor de la famiya djudeo-espanyola + kaseta de kuentos, Kana, Yerushaláyim, 1986 (djudeo-espanyol/ebreo).
Djohá ke dize?, Kana, Yerushaláyim, 1991 (dito).
Konsejas i konsejikas del mundo djudeo-espanyol, Kana, Yerushaláyim, 1994 (dito).
Lejendas i kuentos morales de la tradisión djudeo-espanyola, Nur, Yerushaláyim (dito), 1999.
Sipuré Eliau Anaví, kon notas de Shifra Safra, Midreshet Amalia, Jerusalem, 1993-4 (dito).
De Saragoza a Yerushaláyim, Ibercaja, Zaragoza, 1995 (in Ladino language).
Storie di Giochà, in two editions:one for schools (1991) and another for the general public, Sansoni, Firenze, 1990 (in Italian language).
Le storie del re Salomone. Sansoni, Firenze, 1993 (in Italian).
King Solomon and the Golden Fish, with notes from Reginetta Haboucha, Wayne State University Press, Detroit, Michigan (in English ), 2004.
Ritmo antiko, poezías i kantigas, Edisión de la Autora. Jerusalem, 2005 (djudeo-espanyol-ivrit).
Por el plazer de kontar – Kuentos de mi vida. Selection of stories. Nur Afakot. Jerusalem, 2006 (in Ladino).
Kuentos salados djudeo-espanyoles, Editorial Capitelum, Valencia, 2000 (in Ladino).
Folktales of Joha, Jewish Trickster. Translation to by David Herman, Jewish Publication Society, Philadelphia 2003.
El kurtijo enkantado, Kuentos populares djudeo-espanyoles. Nur Hafakot, (in Ladino and Hebrew), Jerusalem 2003.
Guerta muzikal: Koleksión de piesas muzikales djudeo-espanyolas, (Sefaradís de dor en dor, Music Comedy and Radio adaptation; Maridos i mujeres, Mil i un Djohá, El novio imajinario i Tres ermanikas). Matilda Koén-Sarano, Moshé Bahar, Hayim Tsur and Avraham Reuveni. Jerusalem, 2002 (djudeo-espanyol).
Kuentos del bel para abasho. Kuentos djudeo-espanyoles, Ed. Shalom, Istanbul 2005.
Kon bayles i kantes, Sefaradis de dor en dor (in Ladino). 2009
Vejés liviana, kuentos djudeo-espanyoles. Nur Hafakot, Jerusalem (in Ladino and Hebrew) (2006).

Scripts
Sefaradís de dor en dor, music soap opera. Music by Hayim Tsur. Israeli Ministry for Education and Culture, Jerusalem., 1997, (dito). Adapted for the Radio in 1999 (dito).
Mil i un Djohá, komedia muzikal (múzika de Hayim Tsur), Edisión de la Autora, Jerusalem 1998 (in Ladino). Translated into English by Gloria J. Ascher, U.S.A., 2003.
Maridos i mujeres, radio soap opera in 12 sketches, music by Hayim Tsur, Edisión de la Autora. Jerusalem, 2000 (in Ladino).
Tres ermanikas, komedia radiofónika, music of Hayim Tsur, Edisión de la Autora. Jerusalem, 2000 (in Ladino). Adapted into a play in 2004.

Audiobooks
Viní kantaremos, koleksión de kantes djudeo-espanyoles, Edisión de la Autora, Jerusalem, 1993. Tresera edisión 2003, kuartena edisión 2006.
Jewish Ladino Songs, Hataklit, Ramat-Gan, 1993 (five stories in Ladino) Narration by Matilda Koén-Sarano, music by Hayim Tsur. 
Nostaljía, Hataklit, Ramat-Gan, 1995 (18 stories in ladino. Narration by Matilda Koén-Sarano, music by Hayim Tsur. 
Sefaradís de dor en dor (las kantigas de la komedia muzikal), narrated by Matilda Koén-Sarano; music by Hayim Tsur. Hataklit, 1999. 
Dí ke no es tadre, 14 new stories in Ladino. Narration by Matilda Koén-Sarano, music by Avraham Reuveni. Jerusalem, 2002.
Guerta muzikal: Koleksión de piezas muzikales djudeo-espanyolas (Sefaradís de dor en dor, Music Comedy and Radio adaptation; Maridos i mujeres, Mil i un Djohá, El novio imajinario i Tres ermanikas). Matilda Koén-Sarano, Moshé Bahar, Hayim Tsur and Avraham Reuveni. Jerusalem, 2002.

Language courses
Kurso de Djudeo-Espanyol (Ladino) para Prinsipiantes, Ben Gurion University in the Negev, 1999. En traduksión al inglés de Gloria J. Ascher, idem 1999/2002.
Kurso de Djudeo-Espanyol (Ladino) para Adelantados, Ben Gurion University in the Negev, 1999. (En traduksiyón, idem komo arriva).
Kon Maymon Benchimol, Vokabulario Djudeo- Espanyol (Ladino) – Ebreo; Ebreo -Djudeo-Espanyol (Ladino), Ben Gurion University in the Negev, 1999.
Tabelas de verbos en Djudeo-Espanyol (Ladino), Ed. de la Autora. Jerusalem, 1999.

Cookbooks
Gizar Kon Gozo. Co-written with Liora Kelman. S. Zack. Jerusalem. 2010

Dictionaries
Diksionario Ebreo-Djudeo-Espanyol (Ladino), Djudeo-Espanyol (Ladino)-Ebreo, (Hebrew-Ladino-Hebrew Dictionary). Zak, Jerusalem, (2010).

References

External links
Poemas de Matilde Koen-Sarano. Selection of poetry by Matilda Koen-Sarano.  
Matilda Koen Sarano. Selection of writings. eSefarad. 

20th-century Sephardi Jews
21st-century Sephardi Jews
Italian-language writers
Military personnel from Milan
1939 births
Living people
Judaeo-Spanish-language writers
Israeli women writers
Italian women writers
Italian emigrants to Israel
Italian Sephardi Jews
People of Turkish-Jewish descent
20th-century Italian Jews
Italian people of Turkish descent
Bocconi University alumni
Hebrew University of Jerusalem alumni
20th-century Italian women